Miniature is an album by drummer Joey Baron, saxophonist Tim Berne and cellist Hank Roberts, who would become known as Miniature, which was recorded in 1988 and released on the JMT label.

Reception

The Penguin Guide to Jazz said "Baron's drumming and occasional electronic flourishes provide its most pleasures though Berne and the tricksterish Roberts play their parts as well".

Track listing
All compositions by Tim Berne except as indicated
 "Ethiopian Boxer" (Hank Roberts) - 7:18  
 "Circular Prairie Song (For Bill Frisell)"  2:35  
 "Hong Kong Sad Song" - 8:44  
 "Lonely Mood" (Joey Baron) - 8:03  
 "'Narlin'" - 6:09  
 "Peanut" (Baron) - 6:28  
 "Abeetah (For Jake and Mary)" (Roberts) - 4:46  
 "Sanctuary" - 9:17

Personnel
Tim Berne - alto saxophone
Hank Roberts - cello, voice
Joey Baron - drums, synthesizer

References 

1988 albums
Tim Berne albums
Hank Roberts albums
Joey Baron albums
JMT Records albums
Winter & Winter Records albums